Sacred Heart Catholic Church is a historic church at 716 North 9th Ave in Pensacola, Florida, United States. Completed in 1906, it was sold to the city of Pensacola in 1956. The Unity Church bought the building in 1982. On December 10, 2008, it was added to the U.S. National Register of Historic Places.

References

Former Roman Catholic church buildings in Florida
National Register of Historic Places in Escambia County, Florida
Roman Catholic churches in Pensacola, Florida
Tourist attractions in Pensacola, Florida
Churches in Escambia County, Florida
1906 establishments in Florida